Bonavista Airport is an abandoned airport located near Little Catalina, in Newfoundland, Canada.

References

Defunct airports in Newfoundland and Labrador